Saburo Nakao (born 1936) is a Japanese wrestler. He competed in the men's freestyle heavyweight at the 1956 Summer Olympics.

References

External links
 

1936 births
Living people
Japanese male sport wrestlers
Olympic wrestlers of Japan
Wrestlers at the 1956 Summer Olympics
Place of birth missing (living people)
20th-century Japanese people